WMD Commission usually refers to either:
 The Commission on the Prevention of WMD proliferation and terrorism
 The Weapons of Mass Destruction Commission
 The Commission on the Intelligence Capabilities of the United States Regarding Weapons of Mass Destruction